Zargus is a genus of beetles in the family Carabidae, containing the following species:

 Zargus crotchianus Wollaston, 1865
 Zargus desertae Wollaston, 1854
 Zargus monizii Wollaston, 1860
 Zargus pellucidus Wollaston, 1854
 Zargus schaumii Wollaston, 1854

References

Licininae